John Joseph Thomas (23 August 1896 – 9 December 1980) was an Irish footballer who played as a midfielder and made two appearances for the Irish Free State national team.

Career
Thomas was included in the Irish Free State squad for the 1924 Summer Olympic football tournament in Paris. Though he did not feature in the Olympics, he made two appearances for the team in friendly matches after Ireland's elimination from the tournament. The first match took place on 3 June 1924 against Estonia in Colombes, while the second took place in Dublin on 14 June against the United States. Both matches finished as 3–1 wins for Ireland.

Career statistics

International

References

1896 births
1980 deaths
Association footballers from Dublin (city)
Republic of Ireland association footballers
Irish Free State association footballers
Olympic footballers of Ireland
Footballers at the 1924 Summer Olympics
Association football midfielders
Bohemian F.C. players
League of Ireland players